Tilaru is a village located in Kotabommali mandal in Srikakulam district, Andhra Pradesh, India.

Geography
It has an average elevation of 12 meters (42 feet).

Demographics
According to Indian census, 2001, the demographic details of Tilaru is as follows:
 Total Population: 	3,063 in 676 Households
 Male Population: 	1,552 and Female Population: 	1,511
 Children Under 6-years of age: 381 (Boys - 180 and Girls - 	201)
 Total Literates: 	1,290

Features
 Tilaru railway station is located on Howrah-Chennai mainline. Some long-distance trains halt at Tilaru station. Tilaru is nearest railway station to Narasannapeta town. The Narasannapeta town is on National Highway No 5 and it is only four kilometres from Tilaru. Autorickshaws (three-wheelers) and tri-cycle carriages are available at Tilaru railway station from where one can go to the nearest public transport bus station.
 The major communities in the village are Pollinati Velama and Devanga (weavers).
 Tilaru village is a Grama panchayat. It contains one Zilla Parishad High School, 3 MPE Schools, Govt BC Boys Hostel and Primary Health Center.
 Tilaru village has 3 temples : they are Sri Jagannadha Swami Temple, Sri Sivalingeswara temple, and Venkateswara Temple.
 Tilaru Junction is in Jalumuru mandal, it is a good junction for surrounding  Kotabommali mandal villages Tumbayya peta, Narayanavalsa, Tilaru and Jalumuru mandal villages Chinnadugam, Rayapadu, Kotturu etc.
"SRI MUKHALINGAM  Temple" People called as Dakshin Kasi, is around 15 km from Tilaru railway station. The pilgrims will get down at Tilaru railway station and visit the  famous temple.

Postal Address :Tilaru village, Kotabommali mandal, in Srikakulam Dist PIN 532 474

References

Villages in Srikakulam district